The Soleymaniyeh Palace (Persian: کاخ سلیمانیه) is a Qajar era royal residence in Karaj, Iran. It is notable for the paintings inside that show Agha Mohammad Khan Qajar's brothers and Fathali Shah Qajar and his sons.

History 
The building was constructed by the order of Fathali Shah Qajar in a large garden near the Karaj river. The architect of the place was Hajji Mohammad Hossein Isfahani.

There are two stories regarding the name of the building. The more probable one states that the place was built on the occasion of the birth of the Shah's 34th son named Soleiman Mirza. Soleiman Miza is shown as a kid near the throne in one of the paintings. However, Gaspard Drouville, a Frenchman who was in Iran at the time, reports that a son of Fathali Shah, Mohammad Ali Mirza Dowlatshah, was unhappy of Abbas Mirza's designation as the crown prince, and to prove his worth engaged in warfare with the Ottoman governor of Iraq, Suleiman Pasha, defeated him and took a hefty loot. He then sent the loot to the capital, and the Shah made the palace with that money and named it Soleymaniyeh to forever commemorate the victory over the Ottomans.

There are two paintings by Abdallah Khan in the building, one showing the brothers of Agha Mohammad Khan Qajar, and the other showing Fathali Shah Qajar and his courtiers.

A 5 floors tall Safavid tower used to be near the building once, but it was demolished and now only the ruins of the first floor remains.

It was listed in the national heritage sites of Iran with the number 370 on 21 February, 1949.

References 

Palaces in Iran
National works of Iran
Buildings of the Qajar period
19th-century establishments in Iran
Karaj